"Don't You Know?" is a 1959 popular song written by Bobby Worth, and hit record for singer Della Reese.

The song was adapted from an aria ("Musetta's Waltz") from Puccini's La bohème. The song was Reese's first single on her new label RCA Victor. It helped her get a nomination for a Grammy Award for Best Female Vocalist. 

Previously entitled "You," the song had also been a hit for Sammy Kaye in 1952, reaching number 28.

Chart performance
It became Reese's biggest hit, reaching number one on the U.S. R&B chart. "Don't You Know?" went to number two on the U.S. Pop chart, where "Mack the Knife" by Bobby Darin kept it from number one.  It was a follow-up to her previous big hit, "And That Reminds Me".
"Don't You Know?" charted in South Africa in 1975, where it peaked at number 2 on Springbok Radio Top 20 in May 1975. The song charted for 14 weeks.

References

1952 songs
1952 singles
1959 singles
Cashbox number-one singles
RCA Records singles
Songs written by Bobby Worth
Popular songs based on classical music